Love, Death and the Devil is a 1934 German drama film directed by Heinz Hilpert and Reinhart Steinbicker and starring Käthe von Nagy, Albin Skoda and Brigitte Horney. It is based on Robert Louis Stevenson's story The Bottle Imp.

The film's sets were designed by the art director Otto Hunte and
Willy Schiller. The following year UFA's French subsidiary released a French-language version of the film The Devil in the Bottle.

Main cast

References

Bibliography

External links 
 

1934 films
1930s fantasy drama films
German fantasy drama films
Films of Nazi Germany
1930s German-language films
Films directed by Heinz Hilpert
Films directed by Reinhart Steinbicker
Films based on works by Robert Louis Stevenson
Films based on short fiction
Films about wish fulfillment
Films set in Oceania
German multilingual films
UFA GmbH films
German black-and-white films
1934 multilingual films
1934 drama films
1930s German films